Tricypha pseudotricypha is a moth of the subfamily Arctiinae first described by Rothschild in 1909. It is found in French Guiana, Suriname, Amazonas and Peru.

References

Moths described in 1909
Phaegopterina
Moths of South America